Elivai Mala  (ഏലിവ മല) is a  peak in the Western Ghats of South India. The mountain lies in (Mannarkad taluk) Palakkad district of Kerala, close to the border with Tamil Nadu. With a topographic prominence of 1,540 metres it is one of the ultra prominent peaks of South Asia. It forms the highest point in the Western Ghats to the immediate north of the Palakkad Gap. It is the highest peak in between Anamalai Hills and Nilgiri Hills in Western Ghats.

It is situated approximately 5 kilometres to the south of Siruvani Dam and reservoir. There are a couple of waterfalls nearby including the Siruvani Waterfalls (Kovai Kutralam) and the Atla (Aaralam) Waterfalls.

Nearby locations
Siruvani Waterfalls
Velliangiri Mountains
Meenvallam Waterfall
Atla (Aaralam) Waterfalls
kanjhirapuzha dam 
 kanjhirapuzha botanical gardens 
Kanjhirapuzha ayurveda forest 
 siruvani dam
pattiyar BanglAow
attapadi reserve forest 
silent valley national park

References

Mountains of the Western Ghats
Geography of Palakkad district
Mountains of Kerala